Imperial is an unincorporated community in Upshur County, West Virginia, United States.

The community most likely was named after the local Imperial Glass Sand Company.

References 

Unincorporated communities in West Virginia
Unincorporated communities in Upshur County, West Virginia